Luis Alberto Fernández Alara (born October 26, 1946) is a prelate of the Roman Catholic Church. He served as auxiliary bishop of Buenos Aires from 2009 until 2013, when he became bishop of Rafaela.

Life 
Born in Lomas de Zamora, Fernández Alara was ordained to the priesthood on June 29, 1975.

On January 24, 2009, he was appointed auxiliary bishop of Buenos Aires and titular bishop of Carpi. Fernández Alara received his episcopal consecration on the following March 27 from Jorge Mario Bergoglio, archbishop of Buenos Aires, the later pope Francis, with archbishop of Mercedes-Luján, Agustín Roberto Radrizzani, bishop of Lomas de Zamora, Jorge Rubén Lugones, and archbishop of Santa Fe de la Vera Cruz, José María Arancedo, serving as co-consecrators.

He was appointed bishop of Rafaela on September 10, 2013.

External links 
 catholic-hierarchy.org, Bishop Luis Alberto Fernández Alara

1946 births
21st-century Roman Catholic bishops in Argentina
Living people
People from Lomas de Zamora
Roman Catholic bishops of Rafaela
Roman Catholic bishops of Buenos Aires